The 2004–05 season was the 108th season of competitive football in Scotland.

Major transfer deals

2004
6 July 2004 – Nacho Novo from Dundee to Rangers, £450,000
1 July 2004 – Dado Prso from AS Monaco to Rangers, Bosman
12 July 2004 – Julián Speroni from Dundee to Crystal Palace, £500,000
29 July 2004 – David Murphy from Middlesbrough to Hibernian, Free
30 July 2004 – Henri Camara from Wolverhampton Wanderers to Celtic, Season loan
25 August 2004 – Juninho Paulista from Middlesbrough to Celtic, Free

2005
1 January 2005 – Jean-Alain Boumsong from Rangers to Newcastle United, £8m
5 January 2005 – Thomas Buffel from Feyenoord to Rangers, £2.5m
31 January 2005 – Craig Bellamy from Newcastle United to Celtic, Loan
31 January 2005 – Barry Ferguson from Blackburn Rovers to Rangers, £4.5m
28 January 2005 – Stéphane Henchoz from Liverpool to Celtic, Free

League Competitions

Scottish Premier League

The 2004–05 Scottish Premier League season saw Rangers win the title after a last day win over Hibernian as Celtic were beaten by two late Motherwell goals from Scott McDonald, a win would have been enough for Celtic to retain their title regardless of Rangers' result. Dundee, also on the last day of the season, were relegated to the Scottish First Division after a draw with Livingston. Rangers and Celtic both qualified for the UEFA Champions League while Hibernian, in manager Tony Mowbray's first season in charge, went into the UEFA Cup. Inverness Caledonian Thistle, in their first season in the top flight, finished in 8th place.

Scottish First Division

Scottish Second Division

Scottish Third Division

Other honours

Cup honours

Individual honours

SPFA awards

SFWA awards

Scottish clubs in Europe

Summary

Average coefficient – 4.750

Celtic

Rangers

Hearts

Dunfermline Athletic

Hibernian

Scotland national team

Key:
 (H) = Home match
 (A) = Away match
 WCQ5 = World Cup Qualifying – Group 5

Deaths
14 July: Alex Willoughby, 59, Rangers and Aberdeen forward.
7 August: Gordon Smith, 80, Hibs, Hearts, Dundee and Scotland winger.
30 August: Willie Duff, 69, Hearts and Dunfermline goalkeeper.
30 November: Bill Brown, 73, Dundee and Scotland goalkeeper.
26 January: Jackie Henderson, 73, Scotland forward.

Notes and references

 
Seasons in Scottish football